
The following lists events that happened during 1817 in South Africa.

Events
 A Dutch Reformed Church is established in Uitenhage
 Approximately 200 Scottish artisan immigrants are brought to the Cape Colony by Benjamin Moodie. Among them is David Hume, who becomes an explorer and big-game hunter.

Births
 8 January – Theophilus Shepstone, British administrator in South Africa is born in Westbury-On-Trym near Bristol, England.

References
See Years in South Africa for list of References

 
South Africa
Years in South Africa